Marco Travaglio (born 13 October 1964) is an Italian investigative journalist, writer and opinion leader, editor of the independent journal Il Fatto Quotidiano.

Biography

Travaglio was born in Turin and earned a degree in history from the University of Turin. In 1992 he began to pursue journalism as a career. He started out writing for Catholic publications such as Il nostro tempo ("Our time"), then worked under the renowned journalist Indro Montanelli for newspapers such as Il Giornale and La Voce and gained the attention of Montanelli himself who once said of him: "No, Travaglio does not kill anyone. With a knife. He uses a more refined and not legally punishable weapon: the archives". Between 2006 and 2011, Marco Travaglio was a regular guest of the TV program AnnoZero, hosted by Michele Santoro (also mentioned by Berlusconi in the so-called Bulgarian Edict). Recently, Travaglio has contributed as a columnist to prominent national newspapers and magazines, such as La Repubblica, L'Unità (hosting columns such as "Bananas", "Uliwood Party" and "Zorro") and MicroMega. He still contributes to L'espresso writing a column by the name "Signornò'". In September 2009 he contributed to the founding of the independent newspaper Il Fatto Quotidiano ("The Daily Fact"). He became editor in chief of the paper in 2015.

Political and judicial events of national importance, from Mani pulite to the troubles of controversial political figure Silvio Berlusconi, have been Travaglio's main area of interest. The journalist gained public attention in 2001, after participating in a TV show on state-owned national channel Raidue called Satyricon and hosted by Daniele Luttazzi. He then introduced his bestseller book L'odore dei soldi ("The Scent of Money", co-authored by :Elio Veltri), which investigates the origin of Berlusconi's early fortunes. Berlusconi filed a lawsuit for slander, but since the information was accurate and well documented, he was condemned to pay the legal expenses. The show, aired during the campaign for the Italian general election, was heavily criticized by Berlusconi and his party and labeled by them as a politically motivated, non-objective personal attack. After Berlusconi's victory at the elections, Berlusconi banned Luttazzi (together with Enzo Biagi and Michele Santoro, prominent journalists that had criticized Berlusconi's or investigated his history) from state-owned TV shows (Editto Bulgaro), causing a long debate about freedom of information and censorship in Italy.

On 10 May 2008, Marco Travaglio commented on Renato Schifani's election as president of the Senate that one should "simply ask of the second highest office of the state to explain those relationships with those men who have subsequently been condemned for association with the Mafia" on the RAI current affairs talk show television program Che tempo che fa. The statement of Travaglio resulted in fierce negative reactions from Italian politicians, including from the centre left, except for Antonio Di Pietro who said that Travaglio was "merely doing his job". Some called for chief executives at RAI to be dismissed. The political commentator (and future leader) Beppe Grillo supported Travaglio, while Schifani announced he would go to Court and sue Travaglio for slander. Schifani said Travaglio's accusation was based on "inconsistent or manipulated facts, not even worthy of generating suspicions", adding that "someone wants to undermine the dialogue between the government and the opposition."

In 2009, the German Association of Journalists assigned Travaglio its annual award for Freedom of the Press, describing him as a "brave and critical colleague [...] exposing continually the attempts of Italian politicians, especially Silvio Berlusconi, to influence the media to their advantage and to negate critical reports."

In February 2022, he called the news of an impending Russian invasion of Ukraine an "American fake news". He is a leading critic of Volodymyr Zelenskyy and his stances have been criticized as anti-Ukraine and pro-Vladimir Putin. His newspaper's reporting on the war has been seen as so pro-Russia that the Russian embassy has praised and retweet it.

Travaglio is a Catholic.

Political leanings 
Travaglio considers himself as having always been a liberal, or, like he says, "liberal-montanellian."
During his 2001 interview given to Daniele Luttazzi in the television program Satyricon, he claimed to be a liberal ("a pupil of Montanelli") who found "asylum" in the Left area without identifying himself as leftist. In more recent interviews (2010), confirming such statements, he said he has ideas closer to positions that in other countries are normally represented by the Right.

In a letter sent to il Giornale in 2007, Travaglio referred to himself as Catholic and anticommunist.

"In Germany I would surely vote for Merkel. I liked very much Reagan and Thatcher". However, he said that "my Right doesn't exist. It's imaginary. It's the liberal Right. Cavour, Einaudi, De Gasperi, Montanelli. All dead". During Rai 2's television program Dodicesimo round he stated that in the 2006 general election he had voted on the Senate «without holding my nose for the first time»: that's because, Travaglio said, "Italy of Values made me the gift of candidating a person that I esteem and that has honored my of her friendship, Franca Rame".

On March 29, 2008, Antonio Di Pietro's blog published an article by Travaglio in which he again publicly expressed his vote for Italy of Value for the 2008 general election, however adding "while waiting for a new Einaudi or a new De Gasperi", confirming his liberal leanings. On the blog Voglioscendere, on June 5, 2009, on the eve of the 2009 European Parliament election, he stated he would vote once again for Italy of Values because he was satisfied with its way of opposing the Berlusconi Cabinet.

He explained his vote for Lega Nord as the fulfillment of a promise he had made to himself after leaving Il Giornale in 1994: he would have voted for whoever would "throw down" Berlusconi.

For the 2016 constitutional referendum about the Renzi-Boschi reform, Travaglio supported the "No" campaign and even wrote a book against the reform.

For the 2018 general election, on March 8, 2018, on Otto e mezzo he stated that he had voted for the Five Star Movement.

For the 2020 constitutional referendum about the reduction of the number of MPs in the Parliament, Travaglio supported the "Yes".

Awards and honors 
"International Press Freedom" (Pressefreiheit Preis, 2009)
"Premiolino" (2010)

Publications 
Books by Marco Travaglio (usually co-authored with other investigative journalists) include:
 Bravi ragazzi (Italian for Good fellas), published in 2003 and reporting on politicians Cesare Previti and Silvio Berlusconi's alleged (and later confirmed by court's sentence ) corruption of judges
Lo chiamavano Impunità ("They Call Him Impunity", a humorous reference to the Spaghetti Western Lo chiamavano Trinità), published in 2003, about the SME-Ariosto inquiry and court trial
Mani Sporche (Italian for "Dirty Hands") that reports about the years following the national scandal "Mani pulite" (Italian for "Clean Hands")
 Il Bavaglio ("The Gag") mostly about the Italian politicians' plans to limit freedom of speech and the investigative means of Italian Prosecutors investigating political corruption
Per chi suona la banana ("For Whom the Banana Tolls"; the title is a pun on For Whom the Bell Tolls, with a reference on the banana republic)
 "La scomparsa dei fatti" (2006)
Italia Anno Zero, Chiarelettere, 2009,  (coauthors: Beatrice Borromeo and Vauro Senesi)
È Stato la mafia (translated in "Mafia is State", but also a pun as the same sentence means "It was the mafia", despite "È stata la mafia" would be grammatically correct), Chiarelettere, 2014, 
Slurp. Dizionario delle lingue italiane. Lecchini, cortigiani e penne alla bava al servizio dei potenti che ci hanno rovinati ("Slurp. Dictionary of Italian tongues. Ass-lickers, courtiers and penne alla bava serving the powerful who have ruined us"), Chiarelettere, 2015, 
B. Come Basta! Facts and misdeeds, disasters and lies, laws shame and crimes (without punishment) of the mistress of the state who wants to buy back Italy for the fourth time. Roma, PaperFirst, 2018.

References

External links 

 Il Fatto Quotidiano Independent journal of which Travaglio is the director 
 Voglio scendere Blog by Travaglio and fellow journalists and authors Pino Corrias and Peter Gomez 
 L'Antefatto Official website of Travaglio's independent newspaper, Il Fatto Quotidiano 
 Unofficial Fan site featuring a column and some other contributions by Travaglio not published elsewhere 
 Interview with Marco Travaglio 
 la Repubblica: the controversial interview with Travaglio by Luttazzi 
 Signornò and Carta-Canta columns on L'Espresso 
 
 

1964 births
Living people
Journalists from Turin
Italian Roman Catholics
Italian columnists
Italian male writers
University of Turin alumni
Italian newspaper editors
Italian male journalists
La Repubblica people